Shiravand may refer to the following places in Lorestan:

 Shiravand, Rumeshkhan
 Shiravand, Selseleh
 Keryeh-ye Abdolah Shiravand
 Shiravand Gandabeh
 Shiravand Naveh
 Shiravand-e Olya
 Shiravand-e Sofla